Adil Abdel Aati (full name Adil Mohamed Abdelaati Idries, born February 4, 1966) is a Sudanese political and public figure who was the leader of Liberal Party of Sudan and CEO of  Harambi Foundation. In January 2017, Abdel Aati established the  cross party Sudan of the Future political movement and declared his will to run for Sudan next Presidency elections.

Personal life
Adil Abdel Aati was born in the city of Atbara in  River Nile State, in the Republic of Sudan on 04/02/1966. He left Sudan in 1988 to Poland and since then he lives and works between the two countries in the cities of Atbara – Sudan and Warsaw – Poland.

Education
Adil Entered elementary, middle and high Schools in Atbara, Sudan. He studied later at the Faculty of Law at Cairo University, Khartoum Branch (Now Neelain University) in  Khartoum, Sudan in the years  1985-1988. In Poland he studied Polish Language and Literature at University of Łódź in the academic year 1988-1989. He studied journalism and political science at  the faculty of  Journalism and Political Science at the University of Warsaw (1989-2004) and at Warsaw School of Journalism (2005-2007). Adil has taken many courses and training (1997–Present) and gained several certificates in the fields of IT, Finance, Services and Leadership

Professional life
Adil worked professionally  in the areas of education, journalism, media, publishing, translation, business services and NGOs. He worked while studying as porter and bar-mate (1990-1997) later as teacher  (1997-1999). He was a co-founder, member of the Board and General Director of Omda International LTD, (1999-2003). He worked as Vice-Chairman of the Board and General Director of OIA Ltd (2003- 2005). Adil run his own private business and he is the Owner and General Director of Amalia Services (2005 – present) . He worked also as Analyst and an Economic Adviser on Poland and Central and Eastern Europe and the Baltic States for several Arabic embassies in Poland (2005–present).

Civil society activities
Adil Abdel Aati is very active in the fields of Civil Society and NGOs Activities. He was a member of the Sudanese Human Rights Organization Branch in Poland (1991-1995). He was a Co-Founder and Member of the Board, Sudanese Human Rights Activists Forum -SHRAF (2005- 2008). He was the Founder and Chairman of the Supervising Board, later Chairman of the Board of Harambi Foundation based in Warsaw, Poland (2005–Present). Member of Transparency International (1999–present). Adil was member of the Interim Board, Human Rights Network Advocacy for Democracy –Hand (2011-2016). Adil is  a member of the Board of Trustees, Free Thought Centre, Wad Medani, Sudan (2011–Present). Abdel Aati is a member of Polish-Sudanese Association "Nile-Vistula" and a donor to the WWF foundation. He is also a permanent member of the International Chapter of the Order of Smile, based in Swidnica, Poland (March 2012 – Present)

Political life
Adil Abdel was also active politically. He was the founder of the Liberal Party of Sudan where he was Secretary of Foreign Affairs, later Vice-President  (2003-2008) . He was a co-founder and Chairman of Political Council, Liberal Democratic Party, Sudan ( 2010-2014 ) later the Acting President of LDP (January 2015-January 2016) .  Adil also is honored to be the Patron of the South Sudan Liberal Youth Forum of  the Republic of South Sudan (October 2010 – Present).  He was the Vice-Chairman of Africa Liberal Network, responsible for East Africa Region (2012-2014). He  was Sudan representative in the Alliance of Democrats , Rome, Italy till its Extinction  in 2012.

Intellectual life
Adil Abdel Aati is active in intellectual and cultural movement in  Sudan, Africa and Poland. He published hundreds of articles (in Arabic, English and Polish) in Sudanese, Arabic and Polish newspapers and on the web   on political, cultural, historical fields (1985–present). Adil was a Publisher of a number of books and publications (through Amalia Services) and he is an Electronic Publisher as well (1999–present). He is the Chairman of the Board of Directors of a Sudanyia.Net Electronic Newspaper (2008–Present) and Founder of Atbara.Net portal (1999). Adil is the Author of the only book written by Sudanese about Ali Abdel Latif "Ali Abdel Latif and the roots of Sudanese Liberalism” published in Arabic Language in  Khartoum, Sudan, 2016 . He is the Co-Author of  “Afrykanski_wygnaniec” (African Exile :Identity and Human Rights in the Horn of Africa) published in Polish language in  Warsaw, Poland, 1999. He published also more than ten electronic books and booklets available in Arabic in his own web site.

Awards and Medal
Adil Abdel Aati has got many awards . in June 2017 The Polish Ombudsman of Children has awarded him the "INFANTIS DIGNITATIS DEFENSORI" medal for his role in protecting children rights ( mainly in Sudan and Africa, but also in Poland and Ukraine). Adil has been awarded as well the Order of Smile , the intentional order awarded only on children applications.

See also
 Liberal Party of Sudan
 Sudan of the Future

References
 Africa Liberal Network Annual Report, 2013 :  http://www.africaliberalnetwork.org/wp-content/uploads/2014/03/ALN-Annual-Report-2013-English.pdf
Protests planned for-Sudan, report : http://www.jww.org/blog/protests-planned-for-sudan/
 Hisham Aidi, Rebel Music: Race, Empire, and the New Muslim Youth Culture, Knopf Doubleday Publishing . 
 Sudan's liberal parties call for better relations between North and South, Sudan Tribune : https://web.archive.org/web/20161220182517/http://dev.sudantribune.com/Comment/Article/Index/10-4-2011-Sudan-s-liberal-parties-call-for-better-relations-between-North-and-South/40322
 Darfur – pierwsze ludobójstwo w XXI w. (Polish) at Wonly Media Net: http://wolnemedia.net/darfur-pierwsze-ludobojstwo-w-xxi-w/
Odznaka Honorowa Rzecznika (Polish) at The Polish Ombudsman of Children website https://brpd.gov.pl/odznaka-honorowa-rzecznika
 http://brpd.gov.pl/aktualnosci/obchody-roku-ireny-sendlerowej-zawitaly-do-miasta-dzieci-swiata-rabki-zdroju

Specific

External links
 Adil Abdel Aati
 Harambi Foundation
 Sudan of the Future Campaign

1966 births
Living people
People from River Nile (state)
Sudanese politicians